The Grail or Holy Grail is a mythical object of Arthurian legend.

Grail may also refer to:

Entertainment
"Grail" (Babylon 5), a 1994 episode of the Babylon 5 television series
Grail (DC Comics), the secret society from the comic book Preacher
The Grail, a 1988 adventure video game by Microdeal
The Grail, a 1915 short film directed by William Worthington

Science and technology
Grail (web browser), a free extensible web browser written in Python
GRAIL or Gravity Recovery and Interior Laboratory, a 2011 twin-spacecraft NASA Moon mission
GRAIL (protein), a human enzyme also known as RNF128
 Graphic Input Language, used in the RAND Tablet
 GRAIL (company), a biotechnology and pharmaceutical company

Other uses
SA-7 Grail, NATO reporting name of the Strela 2 Russian surface-to-air missile system
Grail (women's movement), a quasi-religious women's group
Grail Movement, a religious movement inspired by the work of Oskar Ernst Bernhardt
Bernard Grail (born 1946), French general, commandant of the French Foreign Legion

See also
Holy Grail (disambiguation)
Grails (disambiguation)